Raymond Distave (12 November 1913 – 2 November 1993) was a Belgian field hockey player. He competed in the men's tournament at the 1936 Summer Olympics.

Distave died in Ghent on 2 November 1993, at the age of 79.

References

External links
 

1913 births
1993 deaths
Belgian male field hockey players
Olympic field hockey players of Belgium
Field hockey players at the 1936 Summer Olympics